{{DISPLAYTITLE:C13H17NO3}}
The molecular formula C13H17NO (molar mass: 235.279 g/mol) may refer to:

 Dibutylone
 Eutylone
 Lophophorine
 5-Methyl-ethylone
 Pentylone
 Propynyl

Molecular formulas